The Greater Bai or simply Bai languages are a putative group of Sino-Tibetan languages proposed by Zhengzhang, a linguist, in 2010, who argues that Bai and Caijia are sister languages. In contrast, Sagart (2011) argues that Caijia and the Waxiang language of northwestern Hunan constitute an early split off from Old Chinese. Additionally, Longjia and Luren are two extinct languages of western Guizhou closely related to Caijia (Guizhou 1984).

Languages
The languages are:
Bai
Cai–Long languages: Caijia, Longjia, Luren

Hölzl (2021) shows that Caijia, Longjia, and Luren are all closely related to each other as part of a linguistic group that he calls Ta–Li or Cai–Long.

Bai has over a million speakers, but Longjia and Luren may both be extinct, while Caijia is highly endangered with approximately 1,000 speakers. The Qixingmin people of Weining County, Guizhou may have also spoken a Greater Bai language, but currently speak Luoji.

Similarities among Old Chinese, Waxiang, Caijia, and Bai have been pointed out by Wu & Shen (2010).
Gong Xun (2015) has suggested that Bai may be an outlier Sinitic language with a Qiangic substratum, noting that Bai has both a Sino-Bai vocabulary layer and a pre-Bai vocabulary layer. Gong (2015) also suggested that the Old Chinese layer in Bai is more similar to early 3rd-century central varieties of Old Chinese in Ji, Yan, Si, and Yu that display the phonological innovation from Old Chinese *l̥ˤ- > *xˤ-, than to the eastern Old Chinese varieties (i.e. Qingzhou and Xuzhou, etc.) that later impacted Middle Chinese, which show OC *l̥ˤ- > *tʰˤ- > MC th-. This east-west dialectal division in Old Chinese has also been noted by Baxter & Sagart (2014:113-114).

See also
List of unrecognized ethnic groups of Guizhou
Greater Bai comparative vocabulary list (Wiktionary)

References

Sino-Tibetan languages